Tzeni Vanou (born Eugenia Vrachnou; 10 February 1939 – 5 February 2014) was a Greek singer, born in Athens. 

She had planned on studying physics, but she met her mentor, Greek composer Mimis Plessas, who persuaded her to become a singer. She began her career in 1959 performing with the ERT orchestra. In 1964, she won first prize in the Thessaloniki Song Festival. 

At age 74, she died at a Piraeus hospital in 2014 from cancer. During her last few months, she had undergone surgery to remove a tumor in her larynx. She died five days before her 75th birthday.

References

External links

1939 births
2014 deaths
20th-century Greek women singers
Thessaloniki Song Festival winners
Singers from Athens
Deaths from cancer in Greece